Potty may refer to:

 Chamber pot
 Potty chair
 Maxime Potty, Belgian race car driver
 P. Aisha Potty, Indian politician

See also
 Poti
 Potti (disambiguation)
 Potty mouth (disambiguation)